Bula Bula is an album by Italian singer Mina, issued in 2005. Created by Wladimir Palma Saa Jaramillo in Basel - Switzerland 2004.

Musicians

Artist
 Mina - vocal

Arrangement 
 Nicolò Fragile, Massimiliano Pani
 Ugo Bongianni - track 11
 Tullio Pizzorno - track 12

Other musicians 
 Maurizio Dei Lazzaretti - percussion
 Faso - bass
 Sandro Gibellini, Marco Kaserer, Luca Meneghello, Massimiliano Pani - acoustic guitar
 Ugo Bongianni - piano
 Ugo Bongianni, Nicolò Fragile, Massimiliano Pani - keyboards 
 Massimo Moriconi - contrabass
 Nicolò Fragile - electric guitar, hammond organ
 Ugo Bongianni - electric guitar
 Franco Ambrosetti, Emilio Soana - trumpet
 Mauro Parodi - trombone
 Gabriele Comeglio - saxophone
 Massimo Bozzi, Manù Cortesi, Giulia Fasolino, Antonio Galbiati, Massimiliano Pani - backing vocals
 Gabriele Comeglio, Nicolò Fragile, Massimiliano Pani - string orchestration
 Gabriele Comeglio - aerophone orchestration

Track listing 

 Vai e vai e vai - 4:15
 Portati via - 3:54
 Fragile - 3:40
 Se - 4:31
 Fra mille anni - 4:26
 La fin des vacances - 4:20
 Sei o non sei - 3:46
 20 parole - 3:08
 Bell'animalone - 4:08
 Dove sarai - 4:34
 Quella briciola di più - 5:11
 La fretta nel vestito - 7:11

Certifications and sales

References

Mina (Italian singer) albums
2005 albums